Kay Smart (died September 2016) was a British circus performer, of the Smart's circus dynasty.

Her mother died when Kay was three. Smart worked as a trapeze artist as a child. She was married to Billy Smart, Jr.'s brother, Ronnie, making her the daughter-in-law of Billy Smart Sr.

She appeared as a castaway on the BBC Radio programme Desert Island Discs on 26 May 1958. She also wrote the introduction to David Jamieson's book, Billy Smart's circus: a pictorial history (Circus Friends Association, 2004). Smart died in Jersey in September 2016.

References

External links 
 Lion Cubs - British Pathé newsreel of Smart and her daughter Christine with lion cubs

1920s births
2016 deaths
British circus performers
Place of birth missing
Year of birth missing